Wheeler High School is located in northeast Cobb County, Georgia. It is near the U.S. city of Marietta, about 15 miles (24 km) northwest of downtown Atlanta. The school has been in operation since 1965. It is a public high school, accredited by the Southern Association of Colleges and Schools. It is named for Joseph Wheeler who was a Confederate military leader, and later, an American military leader and politician.

The Center For Advanced Studies in Science, Math, & Technology

Wheeler High School's Center For Advanced Studies in STEM (Science, Technology, Engineering, & Math) began teaching classes in 1999.  Since then, it has accepted about 100 freshmen every year. Wheeler's program is a member of the National Consortium for Specialized Secondary Schools of Mathematics, Science, and Technology. The coursework allows magnet students to begin taking college-level courses in math and science by eleventh grade and participating in internships at local businesses by twelfth grade. In 2014 the magnet program earned the STEM Certified School Outreach from Tag-Ed, a Georgia STEM organization.

Notable alumni

 Amir Abdur-Rahim '00: Head Coach, Kennesaw State Owls men's basketball
 Shareef Abdur-Rahim '95: NBA forward, Olympic gold medalist for the U.S. national basketball team
 Byron Capers: former NFL/CFL pro football 
 Brad Armstrong: former professional wrestler
 Jaylen Brown '15: Boston Celtics forward
 Brett Butler: comedian
 Jermareo Davidson '03: NBA power forward
 Randy Edwards: former NFL football player
 Robby Ginepri '01: former professional tennis player
 Dax Griffin '90: actor
 Linda Hamilton 87: defender, U.S. Women's National soccer team
 Jeremy Hermida '02: Major League Baseball player
 J. J. Hickson '07:  NBA player (McDonald’s All-American)
 Trey Wolfe '07: NFL Player 
Richard Howell (born 1990), American-Israeli basketball player for Hapoel Tel Aviv of the Israeli Basketball Premier League
 Tammy Susan Hurt: Vice Chair of the Board of Trustees of the Recording Academy 
 DeQuan Jones '08: Orlando Magic forward
 Jelan Kendrick: basketball player
 Goeff Knorr: '03: composer
 Douglas Lima: professional mixed martial artist, competing for Bellator MMA
 Harold Melton '84: Chief Justice of the Supreme Court of Georgia
 Aries Merritt '03: All-American hurdles, 2012 Olympics U.S. Men's Track Team, gold medalist in 110m hurdles, world record holder in 110m hurdles
 Charles Mitchell 12: basketball player
 Shane Monahan: former Major League Baseball player, Seattle Mariners
 Ron Pope: musician
 Robert Shaw: former NFL football player
 Becca Tobin '04: actress on Glee
 Bob Tway: PGA Tour golfer and 1986 PGA Championship winner
Romello White (born 1998): basketball player for Hapoel Eilat of the Israeli Basketball Premier League
 Reggie Witherspoon '03: All-American 400m, 2008 Olympics U.S. Men's Track Team, gold medalist in 4 × 400 m relay

References

External links
Wheeler High web page
Wheeler Magnet web page

Public high schools in Georgia (U.S. state)
Educational institutions established in 1965
Schools in Cobb County, Georgia
Magnet schools in Georgia (U.S. state)
1965 establishments in Georgia (U.S. state)